The Meitei calendar or the Manipuri calendar or the Kangleipak calendar or the Maliyapham Palcha Kumshing is a lunar calendar used by the Meitei people of Manipur for their religious, agricultural and other cultural activities. The concept of era in Meitei calendar was first developed by Emperor Maliyafam Palcha, in the year 1397 BC (Palcha Era) in the realm of Kangleipak in present-day Manipur. It is believed that the 2nd, 3rd,  4th, 6th and 7th months of the Meitei calendar were named after Poireiten's agricultural activities. Similar to Gregorian calendar, the Meitei calendar also consists of twelve months and seven days but the starting date with the Gregorian calendar is different. The new year day known as, Sajibu Cheiraoba is celebrated on the 1st day of the month Sajibu.

Days

Months

Important days
 Ningol Chakouba (ꯅꯤꯉꯣꯜ ꯆꯥꯛꯀꯧꯕ)- 2nd of Hiyangei month
 Sajibu Nongma Panba (ꯁꯖꯤꯕꯨ ꯆꯩꯔꯥꯎꯕ)- 1st of Sajibu month
 Panthoibi Iratpa (ꯄꯥꯟꯊꯣꯢꯕꯤ ꯏꯔꯥꯠꯄ)
 Imoinu Iratpa (ꯏꯃꯣꯢꯅꯨ ꯏꯔꯥꯠꯄ)- 12th of Wakching month
 Sanamahi Ahong Khong Chingba (ꯁꯅꯥꯃꯍꯤ ꯑꯍꯣꯡ ꯈꯣꯡ ꯆꯤꯡꯕ)-
 Kwaak Taanba (ꯀ꯭ꯋꯥꯛ ꯇꯥꯟꯕ)- 10th of Mera month
 Yaosang (ꯌꯥꯎꯁꯪ) -15th of Lamtaa month, Full moon
 Heikru Hidongba (ꯍꯩꯀ꯭ꯔꯨ ꯍꯤꯗꯣꯡꯕ)- 11th of Langban month
 Mera Chaorel Houba (ꯃꯦꯔꯥ ꯆꯥꯎꯔꯦꯜ ꯍꯧꯕ)- 1st of Mera month
 Mera Hou Chongba (ꯃꯦꯔꯥ ꯍꯧ ꯆꯣꯡꯕ)- 15th of Mera month

Preservation 
Many social associations and organizations are preserving and promoting the traditional calendar of the Meitei people of Manipur.

References

External links 

 

Calendar
Ancient calendars
Lunar calendars
Lunisolar calendars
Time in India